Starościn may refer to the following places:
Starościn, Lublin Voivodeship (east Poland)
Starościn, Lubusz Voivodeship (west Poland)
Starościn, Opole Voivodeship (south-west Poland)